El Telégrafo is a newspaper based in Paysandú, Uruguay.

El Telégrafo may also refer to:

 El Telégrafo (Ecuador), a newspaper based in Guayaquil, Ecuador
 El Telégrafo Mercantil, a former newspaper based in Buenos Aires, Argentina

See also
 Il Telegrafo, a newspaper based in Livorno, Italy
 Telegraph (disambiguation)